Tree House Brewing Company is a brewery located in Charlton, Massachusetts, approximately 60 miles west of Boston. It is considered by some to be amongst the best breweries in the United States, including public beer-rating sites like Untappd (ranked 8th best brewery in the country) and Beer Advocate (brew 3 out of the top ten beers in the country), as well as sites including Forbes, the Boston Globe, and Thrillist. Founded in 2011, the brewery was originally located in Brimfield, Massachusetts, then moved on to Monson, Massachusetts in 2013, before a multimillion dollar project landed them at their current site in 2017. Tree House is a non-distributing brewery—it is only available to buy on site—but given its popularity, lines at the brewery can run an hour or more on certain days.

Founding and early years in Monson
Tree House Brewing Co. was founded in Brimfield, MA in 2011 by Dean Rohan, Nate Lanier, and Damien Goudreau. The three founders had begun as homebrewers, making beer in Lanier's kitchen starting around 2008. Their initial commercial site was a small 2.7 acre farm, on the edge of which sat the tree house which inspired the brewery's name. The brewery's time in Brimfield proved productive, despite legal challenges from at least one citizen in Brimfield, as customers would come to visit, have their growlers filled, and return, passing along rave reviews on the way.

In 2013, after the zoning dispute came to a head, Tree House moved to their site in Monson to Koran Farm, owned by the family of one of the founders. The brewery was operated in a somewhat cramped space in the farm's stand, with a retail store in a shed. In 2014, an expansion was planned in Monson, which expanded the breweries capacity six-fold, from an operation capable of producing about 150 gallons of beer at a time, to one capable of producing about 900 gallons of beer at a time, including a tap room which was able to pour draughts on site on occasion. During this time, Tree House claimed to be one of the only off-the-grid breweries in New England: "The beer is made with well water that is pumped right out of the ground on the property, and he said it is a key ingredient in the final product." The site in Monson has become the home of Tree House's barrel-aging program since their move to Charlton.

Move to Charlton
Following a public hearing in 2016, Tree House was approved to purchase land in Charlton, MA for the construction of their new 53,000 square foot brewery. According to the public hearing notice, the entire project cost approximately $18.5 million, $7.7 million of which was issued as a bond by Mass Development. The new site in Charlton doubled the brewing capacity of the company.

The Charlton site opened in May 2017. Despite continuing to sell beers on-site only, the brewery regularly sells out its supply, which now includes canned beer in addition to draught selections. Though the new site has the capacity to produce nearly 150,000 barrels of beer per year, compared with about 30,000 barrels in the post-2014 Monson site, Lanier had said initially that they would not begin in Charlton by producing at maximum capacity: "We still think we can sell at least 30,000 barrels to a hyper-local market — whether that’s all in house or limited distribution throughout Massachusetts." The continuing success of Tree House is marked by the proposed addition to the Charlton site of a 16,000 square foot area which would include outdoor space and an expanded bar, as well as a 2,000 square foot mezzanine inside the existing space. Further, the burgeoning necessity of a traffic light on the road adjacent to the brewery indicates the heavy traffic driven by the brewery, and illustrates the need for the local community to aid in managing the impact of the brewery because of its popularity.

Expansions
In February 2019, the Hartford Business Journal reported that Tree House purchased a 100-acre farm in Woodstock, CT. This farm will help Tree House in expanding their range of offerings, from fresh fruit to sell at stands on site, as well as to use in further experimenting, as well as bolstering their forays into alternate methods of brewing, such as barrel aging and open fermentation.

In November 2020, it was announced that Tree House was planning expansions to both Cape Cod and Western Massachusetts, in an effort to relieve pressure on their Charlton campus; both locations opened in 2021. Furthermore, planned enhancements at the Charlton location include a series of on-site hiking/biking trails, an orchard of fruit trees, and a set of beehives.

In May 2022, it was announced that Tree House had purchased Tewksbury Country Club in Tewksbury MA, with plans to open an expansive beer hall and retail store, while continuing to operate the golf course and other amenities.

Beers
Tree House is particularly known for their production of American-style IPAs and also their stouts. According to Gary Dzen: "There’s something to know if you’ve never had a Tree House beer: they’re great, almost all of them, from the thick, milky stout to the piney Sap to Julius, which is probably the best IPA I’ve ever had. If you’ve ever heard people describe beers as “soft” and didn’t quite grasp why, you will immediately see with Tree House, whose hoppy beers all maintain a delicate, melon-y quality I’ve never seen matched." Their beers rank 3 of the top 10 beers in the world on Beer Advocate, and 6 out of the top 20.

See also
 Barrel-aged beer

References

2011 establishments in Massachusetts
American beer brands
Beer brewing companies based in Massachusetts
Brimfield, Massachusetts